Cartosat-3 is an advanced Indian Earth Observation satellite built and developed by Indian Space Research Organisation (ISRO), which replaces the Indian Remote Sensing Satellite (IRS) series. It has a panchromatic resolution of 0.25 metres making it one of the imaging satellite with highest resolution in the world at the time of launch and MX of 1 metre with a high quality resolution which is a major improvement from the previous payloads in the Cartosat series.

Potential uses include weather mapping, cartography or defence, and strategic applications.

Overview 
Cartosat-3 has a resolution of 25 cm (10"). It uses 1.2 m optics with 60% of weight removal compared to Cartosat-2. Other features include the use of adaptive optics, acousto optical devices, in-orbit focusing using MEMs and large area-light weight mirrors and advanced sense with a high quality resolution. It has a planned mission life of 5 years.

History 
Cartosat-3 is the 3rd generation of high-resolution imaging satellites developed by ISRO. It was developed in response to increased demand for imaging services to address urban planning, rural resource and infrastructure development needs.

Launch 

PSLV-C47 carrying Cartosat-3 was launched on 27 November 2019 at 03:58 UTC using XL variant of Polar Satellite Launch Vehicle from the Second Launch Pad (SLP) of Satish Dhawan Space Centre into a Sun-synchronous orbit of 450 kilometers. Thirteen commercial ride-sharing 3U cubesats including twelve SuperDoves (Flock-4p) by Planet Labs and one Meshbed by Analytical Space of United States were also put in orbit using the same launch vehicle. Commercial ride-share was arranged by NewSpace India Limited, Spaceflight Industries and ISILaunch.

See also 

 Cartosat-1
 Cartosat-2
 Cartosat-2A
 Cartosat-2B
 Cartosat-2C
 Cartosat-2D
 Cartosat-2E
 Cartosat-2F

References 

Cartosat
Spacecraft launched by India in 2019
Spacecraft launched by PSLV rockets
November 2019 events in India